Seeberg 
 Styrian Seeberg Pass 
 Seeberg lake 
 Seeberg observatory 
 8130 Seeberg 
 Seeberg Saddle

People 

 Gitte Seeberg 
 Peter Seeberg 
 Tom Seeberg 
 Evald Seeberg 
 Xenia Seeberg 
 Hans Chr. Seeberg 
 Wichmann von Seeberg

See also 

 Seeburg (disambiguation)